A special election to the United States House of Representatives for  was held March 3, 2020, the same day as the California presidential primaries. As no candidate received a majority, a runoff took place on May 12, 2020, between the top two finishers Christy Smith and Mike Garcia. Garcia's win was the first time Republicans flipped a Democratic-held House seat in California since 1998.

Katie Hill, who had been elected in 2018, had resigned on November 3, 2019 after reports of an inappropriate relationship with a campaign staffer and allegations of sexual relations with her congressional staff, as well as nude photos of her which were published without her consent. Steve Knight, who had represented the district until 2019, ran in the primary but did not advance to the runoff.

By winning the special election, Garcia finished the remaining balance of Hill's term in the 116th Congress. A separate primary and general election on March 3, 2020, and on November 3, 2020, respectively, was held to determine the representative for the 117th Congress; Garcia narrowly defeated Smith in a rematch.

Background

Buck McKeon (R) represented the district from 1993 until he retired in 2014. Steve Knight (R) then won over Tony Strickland (R) in the 2014 election and served until he was defeated by Katie Hill (D) in 2018 by 8.8 percentage points.

Hill resigned in October 2019 following a scandal in which she admitted to an "inappropriate relationship" with a campaign staffer and nude photos of her were published without her consent.

On November 15, 2019, the Governor of California, Gavin Newsom, issued a proclamation declaring a special election for the 25th Congressional District on May 12, 2020, with a primary on March 3, 2020.

In recent presidential elections the district narrowly voted for Barack Obama (D) in 2008 and Mitt Romney (R) in 2012, while Hillary Clinton (D) won the district by 7 percentage points in 2016.

Candidates 
California uses a primary system in which all candidates run in a single primary regardless of political party. In regular congressional elections, the top two vote getters in the primary advance to a runoff election regardless of party affiliation or vote tally. However, in the special election for the balance of Hill's term, had a candidate received more than 50% of the primary vote, they would have been automatically elected and the runoff election cancelled.

On October 31, 2019, at least a dozen people had filed paperwork with the FEC to run for the seat. According to the certified list of candidates signed by the Secretary of State of California on January 15, 2020, six Democrats and six Republicans had filed for the special election and would appear on the ballot.

Democratic candidate Christopher Smith ended his campaign shortly after participating in the January 9 debate. While stopping short of a full endorsement, he stated "among the remaining field, the progressive candidate with the best chance of winning is Cenk Uygur."

Democratic Party

Declared
 Robert Cooper III, university professor
 Getro Franck Elize, patient resource worker
 David Rudnick, businessman, real estate investor, political activist and U.S. Marine Corps veteran
 Christy Smith, state assemblywoman
 Cenk Uygur, co-founder, CEO, and host of The Young Turks; co-founder of Justice Democrats and founder of Wolf PAC
 Aníbal Valdez-Ortega, attorney and community organizer

Declined
 Alex Padilla, Secretary of State of California
 Henry Stern, state senator

Withdrawn 
 Christopher C. Smith, documentary filmmaker

Republican Party

Declared
 Mike Garcia, U.S. Navy veteran and businessman
 Kenneth Jenks, U.S. Marine Corps veteran and telecommunications executive
 Steve Knight, former U.S. Representative
 Courtney Lackey, businesswoman
 David Lozano, attorney and business owner
 Daniel R. Mercuri, business owner

Declined
 Mike Cernovich, political commentator
 Keith Mashburn, Mayor of Simi Valley
 Rex Parris, Mayor of Lancaster
 Tony Strickland, former state senator

Withdrawn
 Mark Cripe, Los Angeles County deputy sheriff
 Angela Underwood-Jacobs, Lancaster city councilwoman

Special election 

The special election and the primary election for the regular general election for California's 25th congressional district was held on March 3, 2020. The normal primary election determined which two candidates would advance to the 2020 general election, while the special election was to determine who will finish the remainder of Hill's term. No candidate in the special election received more than 50% of the vote so the top two candidates advanced to a runoff to be held on May 12, 2020.

Several candidates were on the ballot in both elections on March 3, as these elections concern two different Congresses.

Debates 
On December 22, 2019, Democratic candidates Christopher Smith, Aníbal Valdéz-Ortega and Cenk Uygur called on Christy Smith, Robert Cooper III and Getro Elize to attend a primary debate "to be held tentatively at College of the Canyons on Thursday, January 9, 2020". The Talk of Santa Clarita, an interview podcast within the district that hosted a Democratic debate during the 2018 election and has interviewed both Christy Smith and Cenk Uygur, also volunteered to host a primary debate for the Democratic candidates on January 25, 2020.

Uygur stated on January 4 that all of the Democratic candidates, with the notable exception of Christy Smith, will attend a debate in Palmdale (at Transplants Brewing Company) on January 9, 2020. Despite receiving an offer by the other candidates to change the date of the debate to better accommodate her, Christy Smith's campaign has stated that her work in the State Assembly prevents her from attending the debate, which is set to be moderated by The Talk of Santa Clarita. Christy Smith's campaign has been given several opportunities to debate on different dates at different venues, including future debates unrelated to the Brewing Company debate, but her campaign also declined, with no reasons given.

Predictions

Endorsements

Results

Runoff 
Since no candidate in the March 3, 2020 special election received more than 50.0% of the vote, a runoff election between the top two finishers was held on May 12, 2020.

Endorsements

Predictions

Polling

Results

See also
 2020 United States House of Representatives elections in California
 List of special elections to the United States House of Representatives
 Super Tuesday

Notes

Partisan clients

References

External links
Official campaign websites
 Mike Garcia (R) for Congress
 Christy Smith (D) for Congress

Public forum with candidates 

California 2020 25
California 2020 25
2020 25 Special
California 25 Special
United States House of Representatives 25 Special
United States House of Representatives 2020 25